Geir Karlstad (born 7 July 1963) is a Norwegian former speed skater and national team speed skating coach.

Biography
Although best at the longest distances (the 5,000 m and the 10,000 m), Geir Karlstad became Junior World Allround Champion in 1982 and, as a senior, won bronze in both the World and European Allround Championships in 1989. Among the dominating speed skaters in the 1980s, Karlstad competed at the 1984 and 1988 Winter Olympics, winning no medals. At the 1992 Winter Olympics in Albertville, he  won the gold medal on the 5,000 m and the bronze on the 10,000 m while skating for Lillestrøm SK. He also represented Aktiv SK, but in his youth he represented SK Ceres.

A severe back injury forced him to end his career before the 1994 Winter Olympics of Lillehammer held in his homeland. He had originally intended to end his career at those Winter Olympics. From 1998 to 2002, he was the national team coach of the Norwegian speed skating team. Karlstad received the Oscar Mathisen Award in 1986.

Medals
An overview of medals won by Karlstad at important championships he participated in, listing the years in which he won each:

Records

World records 
Over the course of his career, Karlstad set five world records:

Source: SpeedSkatingStats.com

Personal records 
To put these personal records in perspective, the WR column lists the official world records on the dates that Karlstad skated his personal records.

Karlstad's personal record on the 3,000 m was not a world record because Leo Visser skated 3:59.27 at the same tournament.

Karlstad has an Adelskalender score of 159.596 points. His highest ranking on the Adelskalender was seventh place.

References

External links
 
 Personal records from The Skatebase

1963 births
Living people
Norwegian male speed skaters
Olympic medalists in speed skating
Olympic speed skaters of Norway
Olympic gold medalists for Norway
Speed skaters at the 1984 Winter Olympics
Speed skaters at the 1988 Winter Olympics
Speed skaters at the 1992 Winter Olympics
World record setters in speed skating
People from Skedsmo
Medalists at the 1992 Winter Olympics
Olympic bronze medalists for Norway
World Allround Speed Skating Championships medalists
Sportspeople from Viken (county)